L'Anse-Saint-Jean, French for "The Cove of Saint John" is a municipality in the Saguenay–Lac-Saint-Jean region of Quebec, Canada. Its population was 1208 in the Canada 2011 Census.

L'Anse-Saint-Jean was founded in 1838 by the Société des Vingt-et-un, a group of lumber prospectors and investors from Charlevoix which was responsible for opening up the Saguenay region to colonization.

Le Royaume de L'Anse-Saint-Jean / Kingdom of L'Anse-Saint-Jean

It achieved a certain notoriety when its citizens held a referendum on January 21, 1997, to turn the village into the Le Royaume de L'Anse-Saint-Jean (The Kingdom of L'Anse Saint Jean), the continent's first "municipal monarchy." The monarchists won 73.9% of the vote, with Denys Tremblay becoming King Denys I. The king was crowned on June 24, Saint-Jean-Baptiste Day, in the Église Saint-Jean-Baptiste, and announced plans to build a "vegetable oratory," Saint-Jean-du-Millénaire (Saint John of the Millennium). This micronational project was cheerfully conceded to be a way of boosting tourism in the region, which had been hit by the 1996 Saguenay Flood.

Gallery

References

Related articles 
 Le Fjord-du-Saguenay Regional County Municipality
 Saint-Jean River, a watercourse
 Zec de la Rivière-Saint-Jean-du-Saguenay, a controlled harvesting zone (zec)
 Saint-Jean Bay, a bay

External links

 Monarchy of L'Anse-Saint-Jean

Populated places established in 1838
Municipalities in Quebec
Micronations in Canada
Incorporated places in Saguenay–Lac-Saint-Jean
Populated places established in 1997
1838 establishments in Lower Canada